Stranger Things is an American science fiction horror streaming television series.

Stranger Things may also refer to:

Film
Stranger Things (film), a 2010 British drama film

Music

Albums
Music of Stranger Things, including a list of soundtrack and compilation albums associated with the TV series
Stranger Things (Marc Almond album), 2001
Stranger Things (Edie Brickell & New Bohemians album), 2006
Stranger Things (Yuck album), 2016

Songs
"Stranger Things" (ABC song), 1997
"Stranger Things" (Kygo song), 2018
"Stranger Things" (Joyner Lucas and Chris Brown song), 2018
"Stranger Things", a song by Periphery from the 2015 album Juggernaut: Omega

See also

Strange Thing (disambiguation)
Stranger Things Have Happened (disambiguation)
Strange Things, a 1990 album by Tackhead
Danger Things, a parody of Stranger Things in The Simpsons